Mark David Brooks (born March 25, 1961) is an American professional golfer who plays on the PGA Tour Champions.

Brooks was born in Fort Worth, Texas. He attended the University of Texas at Austin, where he was a three-time All-American as a member of the golf team. He turned professional in 1983.

Brooks has seven wins on the PGA Tour, including one major, the 1996 PGA Championship. He was a member of the U.S. Presidents Cup team in 1996.

During his thirties, Brooks began a second career in golf course design, and was a partner in the firm of Knott-Linn-Brooks House based in Palo Alto, California. His first major project, Southern Oaks Golf Club outside Fort Worth, opened in 1999.

After his 50th birthday in 2011, Brooks joined the Champions Tour. He came close to his first victory in June at the Principal Charity Classic, but bogeys on his final two holes allowed Bob Gilder to win by one shot. The solo 2nd-place finish was Brooks' best on any tour since his runner-up finish to Retief Goosen at the 2001 U.S. Open. In August 2014, Brooks again finished in solo second on the Champions Tour, after losing a sudden death playoff to Scott Dunlap at the Boeing Classic.

In 2015 Brooks was hired by Fox Sports as an-course analyst for the network's U.S. Open coverage.

Brooks has the record for most starts on the PGA Tour with 803.

Amateur wins (3)
this list may be incomplete
1978 Future Masters
1979 Trans-Mississippi Amateur
1981 Southern Amateur

Professional wins (10)

PGA Tour wins (7)

PGA Tour playoff record (4–3)

Other wins (3)

*Note: The 1993 Pebble Beach Invitational was shortened to 54 holes due to rain.

Playoff record
Champions Tour playoff record (0–1)

Major championships

Wins (1)

1Defeated Kenny Perry with a birdie on the first extra hole.

Results timeline

CUT = missed the half way cut
"T" indicates a tie for a place.

Summary

Most consecutive cuts made – 5 (1990 U.S. Open – 1991 Open Championship)
Longest streak of top-10s – 2 (1996 Open Championship – 1996 PGA)

Results in The Players Championship

CUT = missed the halfway cut
"T" indicates a tie for a place

Team appearances
Professional
Presidents Cup: 1996 (winners)

See also
1983 PGA Tour Qualifying School graduates
1985 PGA Tour Qualifying School graduates
1986 PGA Tour Qualifying School graduates
1987 PGA Tour Qualifying School graduates
List of men's major championships winning golfers

References

External links

American male golfers
Texas Longhorns men's golfers
PGA Tour golfers
PGA Tour Champions golfers
Winners of men's major golf championships
Golf course architects
Golf writers and broadcasters
Golfers from Texas
Sportspeople from Fort Worth, Texas
1961 births
Living people